UFC Fight Night: Mousasi vs. Hall 2 (also known as UFC Fight Night 99) was a mixed martial arts event produced by the Ultimate Fighting Championship that was held on 19 November 2016 at The SSE Arena in Belfast, Northern Ireland

Background
The event was the second that the organisation hosted in Northern Ireland, with the first being UFC 72 in June 2007.

A welterweight bout between ranked contenders Dong Hyun Kim and Gunnar Nelson was expected to serve as the headlined of the event. However, on 21 October, it was announced that Nelson pulled out due to an injury and the fight was cancelled. Kim was rescheduled to compete at UFC 207. In turn, a middleweight rematch between former Strikeforce Light Heavyweight Champion Gegard Mousasi and Uriah Hall was announced as the new headliner. The pairing met previously in September 2015 at UFC Fight Night: Barnett vs. Nelson with Hall taking the victory via second round highlight reel TKO in what was considered a huge upset.

A lightweight bout between Ross Pearson and James Krause was originally booked for The Ultimate Fighter: Team Joanna vs. Team Cláudia Finale. However, Krause pulled out due to undisclosed reasons. The fight was later rescheduled for this event and was expected to serve as the co-main event. Subsequently, on 26 October, Krause pulled out of the fight citing a torn hamstring. He was then replaced by Stevie Ray.

As a result of the cancellation of UFC Fight Night: Lamas vs. Penn, a flyweight bout between Kyoji Horiguchi and Ali Bagautinov was rescheduled for this event.

At the weigh-ins, Zak Cummings came in at 172.8 lb, almost two pounds over the welterweight limit of 171 lb. As a result, Cummings was fined 20% of his purse, which went to his opponent Alexander Yakovlev and the bout proceeded as scheduled at a catchweight.

A flyweight bout between Ian McCall and Neil Seery was scheduled for the event. However, as Seery was weighing in for the event, it was announced that McCall had to pull out of the fight after becoming ill due to the effects of his weight cut and the bout was scrapped.

Results

Bonus awards
The following fighters were awarded $50,000 bonuses:
Fight of the Night: Not awarded
Performance of the Night: Jack Marshman, Kevin Lee, Justin Ledet and Abdul Razak Alhassan

See also
List of UFC events
2016 in UFC

References

UFC Fight Night
2016 in mixed martial arts
Mixed martial arts in the United Kingdom
Sport in Belfast
2016 in Northern Ireland sport
UFC Fight Night: Mousasi vs Hall 2